Angola requires its residents to register their motor vehicles and display vehicle registration plates. Current plates are European standard 520 mm × 110 mm, and use Portuguese dies.

References

External links 
 License plates of Angola at Francoplaque
 License plates of Angola at Worldlicenseplates

Angola
Angola transport-related lists